Nils Herlitz (1888–1978) was a Swedish historian, legal scholar and politician of the Moderate Party. He served as the third President of the Nordic Council in 1955. He served as a member of the upper house of the Swedish parliament from 1939 to 1955.

Herlitz was elected a corresponding fellow of the British Academy in 1971.

Awards and decorations
   Commander Grand Cross of the Order of the Polar Star (21 November 1963)

Honours
Honorary doctorate, University of Oslo, 1961

References 

Members of the Riksdag from the Moderate Party
1888 births
1978 deaths
Corresponding Fellows of the British Academy
Commanders Grand Cross of the Order of the Polar Star
Members of the Royal Swedish Academy of Sciences